Richard Voliva (1912–1999) was an American wrestler and coach. He was Olympic silver medalist in Freestyle wrestling in 1936.

References

External links
 

1912 births
1999 deaths
Wrestlers at the 1936 Summer Olympics
American male sport wrestlers
Olympic silver medalists for the United States in wrestling
Medalists at the 1936 Summer Olympics